Marcel Gauthier (July 21, 1928 – November 6, 1998) was a Canadian professional midget wrestler who wrestled under the ring name Sky Low Low (a reference to Sky Hi Lee).

Professional wrestling career
Known by his midget wrestler persona "Sky Low Low", Gauthier stood just 42 inches tall and weighed 86 pounds. He began wrestling in the 1940s. He made his debut in the Canadian National Wrestling Alliance and soon claimed the NWA World Midget Championship in Paris, France. He was managed for the bulk of his career by Jack Britton, father of Gino Brito. Gauthier and Little Beaver squared off in a match for Elizabeth II of the United Kingdom and King Farouk of Egypt. 

Touring with the World Wrestling Federation as late as the 1980s, one of his gimmicks was an open challenge to any other midget professional wrestlers to beat him in a two out of three falls match for $100. He could also stand on his head without using his hands to balance himself. He had a longtime feud with Farmer Brooks.

Personal life
During World War II, he worked in the tail of an aircraft bomber, fixing rivets. He liked fishing, golfing, and horseback riding. He died on November 6, 1998 from a heart attack. He was married at the time of his death. He was posthumously inducted into the Professional Wrestling Hall of Fame in 2002.

Championships and accomplishments
Professional Wrestling Hall of Fame and Museum
Class of 2002
National Wrestling Alliance
NWA World Midget's Championship (1 time, inaugural)
Pro Wrestling Illustrated
PWI Midget Wrestler of the Year (1975)
Stampede Wrestling
Stampede Wrestling Hall of Fame (Class of 1995)
 Other titles
Midgets' World Championship (2 times)

References

External links
 

1928 births
1998 deaths
20th-century professional wrestlers
Canadian male professional wrestlers
Midget professional wrestlers
Professional Wrestling Hall of Fame and Museum
Stampede Wrestling alumni
Professional wrestlers from Montreal